The Cayman Islands People's Party is a centrist political party in the Cayman Islands currently led by Ezzard Miller.

History
The CIPP was registered with the Cayman Elections Office in November 2020. The CIPP is only the third formal political party in the Cayman Islands and the only one to have achieved non-profit status. The party was founded on the principles of "economic growth, care for the environment, and social well being".

The Cayman Islands People's Party contested in a general election for the first time in 2021 and did not win any seats.

List of Leaders of the Cayman Islands People's Party

Ezzard Miller (2020 – Present)

Electoral Performance

References 

Political parties in the Cayman Islands
2020 establishments in the Caribbean